The 2019 Sultan of Johor Cup was the ninth edition of the Sultan of Johor Cup, an international men's under–21 field hockey tournament in Malaysia. It was held in Johor Bahru, Malaysia from 12 to 19 October 2019.

As in previous editions, a total of six teams competed for the title. All the teams that appeared in the 2018 edition returned for the 2019 tournament.

The defending champions Great Britain won the tournament for the third time by defeating India 2–1 in the final. The hosts Malaysia won the bronze medal by defeating Japan 2–1.

Participating nations
Including the host nation, 6 teams competed in the tournament.

Results
All times are in Malaysia Standard Time (UTC+8).

Preliminary round

Classification round

Fifth and sixth place

Third and fourth place

Final

Statistics

Final standings

Awards
The following awards were given at the conclusion of the tournament.

Goalscorers

See also
2019 Sultan Azlan Shah Cup

References

External links
Official website 

Sultan of Johor Cup
Sultan of Johor Cup
Sultan of Johor Cup
Sultan of Johor Cup
Sultan of Johor Cup